Josef Krejci (born 2 March 1911, date of death unknown) was an Austrian field handball player who competed in the 1936 Summer Olympics. He was part of the Austrian field handball team, which won the silver medal. He played two matches.

References

Josef Krejci's profile at databaseOlympics.com
Josef Krejci's profile at Sports Reference.com

1911 births
Year of death missing
Austrian male handball players
Field handball players at the 1936 Summer Olympics
Olympic handball players of Austria
Olympic silver medalists for Austria
Olympic medalists in handball
Medalists at the 1936 Summer Olympics